Dental care or dentalcare is the maintenance of healthy teeth and may refer to:

 Oral hygiene, the practice of keeping the mouth and teeth clean in order to prevent dental disorders
 Dentistry, the professional care of teeth, including professional oral hygiene and dental surgery
 Oral Surgery, any of a number of medical procedures that involve artificially modifying dentition; in other words, surgery of the teeth and jaw bones
 "Dental Care", a 2009 song by Owl City on the album Ocean Eyes

See also